Lakeland Highlands is an unincorporated community and census-designated place (CDP) in Polk County, Florida, United States. The population was 11,056 at the 2010 census. It is part of the Lakeland–Winter Haven Metropolitan Statistical Area. It is an affluent residential community located south of the Lakeland city limits, and north of the Mulberry city limits. Lakeland Highlands neighbors Medulla, and together the two communities make up much of what is known as South Lakeland (unincorporated). 

The area is addressed to Lakeland, with zip codes 33807, 33812, and 33813. Its schools include, George W. Jenkins Senior High School (named after the founder of Publix Supermarkets, based in Lakeland), Scott Lake Elementary, Lakeland Highlands Middle School and Valleyview Elementary. This area has been experiencing high growth for over two decades with new subdivisions being developed every year. Considered part of the Tampa Bay Area, it is becoming a bedroom community of Tampa.

Geography
Lakeland Highlands is located at  (27.963351, -81.949439).

Demographics

As of the census of 2000, there were 12,557 people, 4,501 households, and 3,740 families residing in the CDP. The racial makeup of the CDP was 94.21% White, 2.47% African American, 0.20% Native American, 1.66% Asian, 0.02% Pacific Islander, 0.48% from other races, and 0.97% from two or more races. Hispanic or Latino of any race were 3.85% of the population.

There were 4,501 households, out of which 39.4% had children under the age of 18 living with them, 74.0% were married couples living together, 6.8% had a female householder with no husband present, and 16.9% were non-families. 14.2% of all households were made up of individuals, and 6.2% had someone living alone who was 65 years of age or older.  The average household size was 2.79 and the average family size was 3.08.

In the CDP, the population was spread out, with 27.3% under the age of 18, 5.8% from 18 to 24, 24.7% from 25 to 44, 29.2% from 45 to 64, and 13.1% who were 65 years of age or older.  The median age was 41 years. For every 100 females, there were 94.7 males.  For every 100 females age 18 and over, there were 93.0 males.

The median income for a household in the CDP was $66,053, and the median income for a family was $71,176. Males had a median income of $50,714 versus $30,018 for females. The per capita income for the CDP was $31,122.  About 2.1% of families and 3.3% of the population were below the poverty line, including 3.0% of those under age 18 and 3.7% of those age 65 or over.

References

External links
 Lakeland Highlands information

Census-designated places in Polk County, Florida
Unincorporated communities in Polk County, Florida